Sir Gualterus Stewart Schneider (12 April 1864 – c. September 1938) was a member of the State Council of Ceylon and the 7th Solicitor General of Ceylon. He was appointed on 1917, succeeding Thomas Garvin, and held the office until 1917. He was succeeded also by Thomas Garvin.

He was made a Knight Bachelor in the 1928 Birthday Honours. In 1931, he was appointed to the First State Council by the Governor. The State Council was ceremonially opened on 10 July 1931, and Sir Stewart was defeated by A. F. Molamure for the post of speaker by 35 to 18 votes. 

He was the grandson of  Gualterus Schneider, the first Surveyor-General of Ceylon.

References

Solicitors General of Ceylon
Sri Lankan people of German descent
1864 births
1938 deaths
Ceylonese Knights Bachelor
Members of the 1st State Council of Ceylon